Irondale is a census-designated place (CDP) in Clayton County, Georgia, United States. The population was 8,740 at the 2020 census.

Geography
Irondale is located south of the center of Clayton County at  (33.475430, -84.360326). U.S. Routes 19 and 41 form the eastern edge of the CDP and lead north  to Jonesboro, the county seat.

Demographics

2020 census

As of the 2020 United States census, there were 8,740 people, 2,298 households, and 1,796 families residing in the CDP.

2000 census
As of the census of 2000, there were 7,727 people, 2,543 households, and 2,049 families residing in the CDP. The racial makeup of the CDP was 46.84% White, 47.09% African American, 0.49% Native American, 1.92% Asian, 0.01% Pacific Islander, 1.53% from other races, and 2.12% from two or more races. Hispanic or Latino of any race were 4.18% of the population.

There were 2,543 households, out of which 50.9% had children under the age of 18 living with them, 57.0% were married couples living together, 18.4% had a female householder with no husband present, and 19.4% were non-families. 15.6% of all households were made up of individuals, and 1.6% had someone living alone who was 65 years of age or older.  The average household size was 3.04 and the average family size was 3.37.

In the CDP, the population was spread out, with 33.5% under the age of 18, 8.8% from 18 to 24, 38.3% from 25 to 44, 15.9% from 45 to 64, and 3.5% who were 65 years of age or older.  The median age was 30 years. For every 100 females, there were 91.2 males.  For every 100 females age 18 and over, there were 85.5 males.

The median income for a household in the CDP was $49,386, and the median income for a family was $51,152. Males had a median income of $35,967 versus $27,577 for females. The per capita income for the CDP was $18,186.  About 7.2% of families and 8.8% of the population were below the poverty line, including 13.4% of those under age 18 and 5.6% of those age 65 or over.

References

Census-designated places in Clayton County, Georgia
Census-designated places in Georgia (U.S. state)